Dorothea Tieck (March 1799 – 21 February 1841) was a German translator, known particularly for her translations of William Shakespeare. She was born in Berlin to Ludwig Tieck and Amalie Alberti. She collaborated with her father and his Romantic literary circle, including August Wilhelm Schlegel and Wolf Heinrich Graf von Baudissin.  She completed the translation of Shakespeare's works, which her father had begun with Schlegel and Baudissin, and worked also on Miguel de Cervantes and other Spanish writers.

Macbeth translation
Tieck's translation of Macbeth is particularly noted and has frequently been republished alone. Her translation of one of the play's best-known speeches follows:
Tomorrow, and tomorrow, and tomorrow,Creeps in this petty pace from day to day,To the last syllable of recorded time;And all our yesterdays have lighted foolsThe way to dusty death. Out, out, brief candle!Life's but a walking shadow, a poor playerThat struts and frets his hour upon the stageAnd then is heard no more. It is a taleTold by an idiot, full of sound and furySignifying nothing.

Morgen, und morgen, und dann wieder morgen,Kriecht so mit kleinem Schritt von Tag zu Tag,Zur letzten Silb auf unserm Lebensblatt;Und alle unsre Gestern führten NarrenDen Pfad zum staubigen Tod.  Aus, kleines Licht!Leben ist nur ein wandelnd Schattenbild,Ein armer Komödiant, der spreizt und knirschtSein Stündchen auf der Bühn und dann nicht mehrVernommen wird; ein Märchen ists, erzähltVon einem Blödling, voller Klang und Wut,Das nichts bedeutet.

References

External links

1799 births
1841 deaths
German translators
Writers from Berlin
People from the Province of Brandenburg
Translators of William Shakespeare